The M'Goun mountain, also rendered as Ighil Mgoun / Ighil M’Goun / Irhil M’Goun (in tifinagh ⵉⵖⵉⵍ ⵎⴳⵯⵏ), Ighil n’Oumsoud, Jebel Mgoun, Jebel Ighil M’Goun and Jebel Aït M’goun, at 4,071 metres (13,356 ft) is the third highest peak of the Atlas Mountains after Toubkal and Ouenkrim.

It is an ultra prominent peak located in the Drâa-Tafilalet region of Morocco.

See also
 List of Ultras of Africa

References

External links

Mountains of Morocco
Atlas Mountains
Geography of Drâa-Tafilalet
Four-thousanders of Africa